El Inmortal. Gangs of Madrid is a Spanish crime drama television series produced by Movistar+, Telemundo International Studios and DLO Producciones. It stars Álex García in the leading role.

Premise 
The plot consists of the fictionalization of the story of 'Los Miamis', a criminal organization led by "El inmortal" that controlled cocaine trafficking in Madrid in the 1990s.

Cast

Production 
Produced by Movistar+ and Telemundo International Studios in collaboration with DLO Producciones, the series was written by Diego Sotelo and David Moreno and directed by David Ulloa and Rafa Montesinos. Consisting of eight 50-minute-long episodes, the series began shooting in Madrid (Aluche) on 4 May 2021. Shooting took place in locations of the Madrid region and the province of Alicante and wrapped by August 2021.

Release 
The series was presented at the Vitoria-based FesTVal. It premiered on Movistar+ on 27 October 2022.

Reception 
Raquel Hernandez Luján of HobbyConsolas rated the series 70 points ("good") citing the good performances and setting, as well as the soundtrack featuring 90s hits as the best things about the series, while also highlighting two important question marks such as the anticlimactic (open) ending and the poor sound production, with dialogues requiring to be guessed on the fly as inaudible as they are.

Accolades 

|-
| rowspan = "2" align = "center" | 2023 || 10th Feroz Awards || Best Actor in a TV Series || Álex García ||  || 
|-
| 31st Actors and Actresses Union Awards || Best Television Actor in a Leading Role || Álex García ||  || 
|}

References 

Movistar+ original programming
Television series set in the 1990s
Television shows set in Madrid
Television shows filmed in Spain
2020s Spanish drama television series
Spanish crime television series
Spanish-language television shows
Television series by DLO Producciones
2022 Spanish television series debuts
2020s crime television series
Television series about illegal drug trade